Pathardeulgaon, (also spelled as "Pathar Deulgaon") is a village located in Badnapur taluka of Jalna district in the state of Maharashtra, India.

Demographics
As per 2011 census:
Pathardeulgaon has 258 families residing. The village has population of 1220.
Out of the population of 1220, 666 are males while 554 are females.
Literacy rate of the village is 71.08%.
Average sex ratio of the village is 832 females to 1000 males. Average sex ratio of Maharashtra state is 929.

Geography

References

Villages in Jalna district